Hamilton County is a county located in the north central portion of the U.S. state of Florida. As of the 2020 census, the population was 14,004, down from 14,799 at the 2010 census. Its county seat is Jasper.

History
Hamilton County was created in 1827 from portions of Jefferson County.  It was named for Alexander Hamilton, first United States Secretary of the Treasury.

Geography
It is the only county in Florida entirely north of Interstate 10.

Adjacent counties
 Echols County, Georgia - north
 Columbia County - east
 Suwannee County - south
 Madison County - west
 Lowndes County, Georgia - northwest

Major Highway

  Interstate 75
  U.S. Route 41
  U.S. Route 129
  State Road 6
  State Road 100
  State Road 136
  State Road 143

Politics

Voter Registration
According to the Secretary of State's Office, as of September 30, 2022 Republicans hold a plurality of registered voters in Hamilton County for the first time in over a century. The county has radically shifted from being a Democratic stronghold to becoming a Republican one during the 21st century.

Demographics

2020 census

As of the 2020 United States census, there were 14,004 people, 4,381 households, and 3,082 families residing in the county.

2000 census
As of the census of 2000, there were 13,327 people, 4,161 households, and 2,995 families residing in the county.  The population density was 26 people per square mile (10/km2).  There were 4,966 housing units at an average density of 10 per square mile (4/km2).  The racial makeup of the county was 58.79% White, 37.72% Black or African American, 0.42% Native American, 0.20% Asian, 0.02% Pacific Islander, 1.69% from other races, and 1.17% from two or more races.  6.36% of the population were Hispanic or Latino of any race.

There were 4,161 households, out of which 32.90% had children under the age of 18 living with them, 50.30% were married couples living together, 16.80% had a female householder with no husband present, and 28.00% were non-families. 24.10% of all households were made up of individuals, and 9.10% had someone living alone who was 65 years of age or older.  The average household size was 2.60 and the average family size was 3.07.

In the county, the population was spread out, with 23.50% under the age of 18, 10.80% from 18 to 24, 31.80% from 25 to 44, 22.80% from 45 to 64, and 11.20% who were 65 years of age or older.  The median age was 35 years. For every 100 females there were 135.00 males.  For every 100 females age 18 and over, there were 145.40 males.

The median income for a household in the county was $25,638, and the median income for a family was $30,677. Males had a median income of $26,999 versus $20,552 for females. The per capita income for the county was $10,562.  About 21.70% of families and 26.00% of the population were below the poverty line, including 35.70% of those under age 18 and 16.10% of those age 65 or over.

Education

Hamilton County School District operates public schools in the county. The sole elementary school is Hamilton County Elementary School, and the sole high school is Hamilton County High School.

Hamilton County is served by the Suwannee River Regional Library System, which contains eight branches and also serves Madison and Suwannee counties.

Libraries in Hamilton County include:
 Jasper
 Jennings
 White Springs

Communities

City
 Jasper

Towns
 Jennings
 White Springs

Unincorporated communities

 Avoca
 Bakers Mill
 Bellville
 Blue Springs
 Crossroads
 Hillcoat
 Marion
 Rawls
 Watson
 West Lake

See also
 National Register of Historic Places listings in Hamilton County, Florida

References

External links

Government links/Constitutional offices
 Hamilton County Board of County Commissioners
 Hamilton County Supervisor of Elections
 Hamilton County Property Appraiser
 Hamilton County Sheriff's Office
 Hamilton County Tax Collector

Special districts
 Hamilton County Schools - dead link
 Suwannee River Water Management District

Judicial branch
 Hamilton County Clerk of Courts
  Public Defender, 3rd Judicial Circuit of Florida serving Columbia, Dixie, Hamilton, Lafayette, Madison, Suwannee, and Taylor Counties
  Office of the State Attorney, 3rd Judicial Circuit of Florida
  Circuit and County Court for the 3rd Judicial Circuit of Florida

Tourism links
 Hamilton County Tourism Development Council

 
Florida counties
1827 establishments in Florida Territory
Populated places established in 1827
North Florida